The New Toronto is a mixtape by Canadian rapper Tory Lanez; Releasing The New Toronto on Christmas of 2015. The project arrived alongside the installment of Tory's R&B-focused Chixtape series.

The mixtape features production from Lanez himself alongside his longtime collaborator Play Picasso, C-Sick, and more. Guest features include singer Brittney Taylor and rapper Nyce.

Track listing

Sample credits
"One Day" contains interpolations from "I Can Tell", performed by 504 Boyz featuring Mercedes.

References

2015 mixtape albums
Albums produced by C-Sick
Tory Lanez albums
DJ Drama albums